Vatta Parambath Sathyan (29 April 1965 – 18 July 2006), popularly known as V. P. Sathyan, was a former Indian professional footballer who played the centre back position. He was the captain of the India national football team from 1991 to 1995. He was named the 1992 AIFF Player of the Year.

Career
Sathyan started his career in 1983 representing Kerala in the Santosh Trophy National Championship. He attended the South Zone camp for Indian probables under Amar Bahadur in 1985. Strongly built and a capable defender, he joined the national team for the 1985 SAF Games in Dhaka. By 1986, he had represented the country in the Nehru Cup in Thiruvananthapuram and in the Seoul Asian Games.

Sathyan was a key member of the Kerala Police Football team which won the Federation Cup twice in 1989–90 and in 1990–91. He went from the Kerala Police team to Kolkata in 1991, where he played for two seasons, one in Mohammedan Sporting Club and one in Mohun Bagan before returning to the Kerala Police again and then moving to Indian Bank in 1996. Sathyan served first as a player from 1995 to 2001 and then as the team's coach.

In 1991, Sathyan became the captain of the Indian team for the World Cup qualifiers in Beirut and Seoul. He led the Indian team to a gold medal in the 1995 SAF Games in Madras (Present Chennai). He also led Kerala to the Santosh Trophy title in 1992.

Sathyan was the AIFF player of the year in 1992. As a coach, he was an assistant to Stephen Constantine in 2002 when India toured South Korea.

International goals
Scores and results list India's goal tally first..

Personal life
VP Sathyan was born on 29 April 1965 in Mekkunnu near Chokli, Kannur district, to Vatta Parambath Gopalan Nair and Narayani Amma. He was married to Anitha, who is now working as a clerk at the Sports Council Office in Kozhikode and had a daughter Athira, who got married in 2017. Unfortunately, VP Sathyan committed suicide by jumping to an oncoming train in Chennai on 18 July 2006 because he was suffering from depression due to the lack of recognitions/credits/awards he received and the lost of wealth after retirement from his football career.

In popular culture
The 2018 Indian biographical film Captain is based on Sathyan's life. Jayasurya portrayed Sathyan in the film, while Anu Sithara played his wife, Anitha.
In 2019, Jayasurya won the Kerala State Film Award for Best Actor for his performance in Captain.

Honours

India
SAFF Championship: 1993; runner-up: 1995
 South Asian Games Gold medal: 1985; Silver medal: 1993

References

External links
 
 His photo by Telegraph India.com
 His photo in Kerala Police's website
 Article on Sathyan
 Documentary about V. P. Sathyan on YouTube

1965 births
2006 deaths
Suicides in India
Suicides by train
Malayali people
Sportspeople from Kannur
Footballers from Kerala
Indian footballers
India international footballers
Mohun Bagan AC players
Footballers at the 1986 Asian Games
Association football fullbacks
Association football midfielders
Asian Games competitors for India
South Asian Games medalists in football
South Asian Games gold medalists for India
South Asian Games silver medalists for India
2006 suicides